Wagner Rivera (born September 18, 1972), is an Ecuadorean retired football player, playing right back and central back in the Club Deportivo Espoli.

Club career
Wagner Rivera started playing for Espoli and then played for Flamengo beginning in 1996.

Rivera began his career playing defense with Espoli, a small club in Quito. At that time he stood out so he stayed until mid-season 1996 when he began to attract the interest of other clubs in Ecuador and abroad.

In 1996, the Flemish include Argentine Raçudo Mancuso. Rivera accepted the invitation to defend for Dearest Brazil. In Gavia, the Ecuadorian mission would be to form the central defense alongside names like Fabio and then Ronaldão.

Rivera played 15 games for Fla, all in 1996. The following year he returned to his home country, to defend the Barcelona of Guayaquil for three seasons. The team reached the semifinals of the Libertadores Cup in 1997.

Before ending his career in 2006 defending the same Guayaquil Barcelona, Rivera played for Octubrino Bold and Santa Rita, both Ecuadorian clubs.

Career statistics
(Correct )

according to combined sources on the Flamengo official website and Flaestatística.

Honours
Campeonato Equatoriano: 1997

References

External links
ogol.com.br
 Player profile @ Flapédia

1972 births
Living people
Footballers from Quito
Association football defenders
Ecuadorian footballers
C.D. ESPOLI footballers
CR Flamengo footballers
Barcelona S.C. footballers